Inbavalli is a 1949 Indian Tamil-language film directed by S. Nottani, starring T. R. Mahalingam and B. S. Saroja.

Plot 
It is a love story between a princess and the minister's son. Both of them grew up together and eventually fall in love with each other. However, the reigning queen has an idea of marrying her daughter to a prince. Learning this, the lovers elope together during a night. A massive hunt for them begins. There is a wily magician who is also interested in the princess. He finds the minister's son and captures him by his tricks. But an old lady saves the minister's son. She transforms him into a parrot. The parrot flies away and escapes. The palace dancer take refuge of the parrot.
After many twists and turns finally the lovers are united.

Cast 

Male cast
 T. R. Mahalingam as Minister's son
 N. S. Krishnan
 M. R. Swaminathan as Wizard
 E. R. Sahadevan
 P. Sundara Rao
 T. V. Sethuraman
 Baboon Shankara Iyer
 M. Lakshmanan
 C. V. Velappa
 A. V. Ramkumar
 K. S. Harihara Iyer
 Radhakrishnan

Female cast
 B. S. Saroja as Princess
 T. A. Madhuram
 P. K. Saraswathi as Palace Dancer
 S. Menaka
 M. D. Krishna Bai as Queen
 K. S. Angamuthu
 M. Saroja
 K. Jayalakshmi
 Sethulakshmi
 Bhagyalakshmi

Production 
The film was produced by Shyamala Pictures and shot at Ratna Studios, Salem. The film is a folklore-genre tale with incredible twists. May be inspired by the classic The Arabian Nights, this film has scenes where humans are transformed into animals like bears and monkeys and also shows a kind of mirror in which one can see the  past and the future. Cinematography was handled by V. B. Jagtab.

Soundtrack 
Music was composed by G. Ramanathan and lyrics were penned by Rajagopala Iyer and K. P. Kamatchi.

References

External links 
 

1940s Tamil-language films
1949 films
Indian black-and-white films
Films scored by G. Ramanathan